The 1990–91 Georgia State Panthers men's basketball team represented Georgia State University during the 1990–91 NCAA Division I men's basketball season. The team's head coach was Bob Reinhart in first season at GSU. They played their home games at GSU Sports Arena and are members of the Trans America Athletic Conference (TAAC). They finished the season 16–15, 7–7 in TAAC play to finish in fifth place. They won the TAAC tournament to earn a bid to the 1991 NCAA tournament as No. 16 seed in the Southeast region. The Panthers were beaten in the opening round by eventual Final Four participant Arkansas, 117–76.

Roster

Schedule

|-
!colspan=9 style=| Regular season

|-
!colspan=9 style=| TAAC Tournament

|-
!colspan=9 style=| NCAA tournament

References

Georgia State Panthers men's basketball seasons
Georgia State
Georgia State
Georgia State Panthers men's basket
Georgia State Panthers men's basket